Vaphai is a village at the extreme east of Champhai district of Mizoram.

Geography and location

Vaphai, with an average altitude of 5,686 feet (1,733 m) above sea level, lies about 11 km east of Tehsil Main Town Khawbung, and 36.3 km south of Champhai, the district capital. Its distance from the state capital Aizawl is around 88 km. Nearby villages include Farkawn (7.5 km, south west), Khawbung (11 km, west), Khuangthing (13.2 km), Khuangleng (19 km), Biate (22.7 km). The nearest towns are Khawbung  (11 km), Champhai (36.3 km), Khawzawl (44.8 km), Ngopa (79.8 km).

Etymology

Its original name was "Ivaphai", which literally means "Plains of the river Iva", referring to its original location in the river valley slightly west of its present location. The first syllable got dropped probably by elision in course of time. It is situated at an average altitude of 5,686 feet (1,733 m) above sea level.

History

The village was established by Pu Mitinlianan in 1876 who started ruling the village for 45 years till his death in 1921. It was then ruled by Pu Chawnghleithanga in 1922 (1 year), who then passed it on to his son Pu Tlangtinchhuma who ruled till 1937 (14 years). The last chieftainship was held by Pu Lalrokhama (17 years) until the abolition of chieftainship in 1954.

Demographics 

According to the 2011 census of India, Vaphai has 454 households. The effective literacy rate (i.e. the literacy rate of population excluding children aged 6 and below) is 95.25%.

Tourism 

Since the Mizos moved into Mizoram from the east, most historical monuments and places of cultural importance are to be found in eastern Mizoram and Burma. Places of importance inside and near the jurisdiction of Vaphai Village Council include Thlangtlak Mual, Thasiama Nghaleng Khawina, Fiara Tui, Lungkhawsa, Sakhawhmun lui, Ṭhasiama se no neihna tláng, Ṭan tláng and Ṭhasiama hmun.

Ṭan tláng, lit. Ṭan mountain, with a height of 6,027 feet (1,837 m) is the fifth-tallest mountain in Mizoram.

Economy and border haat trade 

Vaphai (Saikhumphai) is one of the 4 Border Haats (markets) in Mizoram, others being at Sangau (Pangkhua), Hnahlan and Zote, all of which boost the local trade and economy.

Transport and connectivity 

Zokhawthar (88 km north) provides connectivity to India–Myanmar–Thailand Trilateral Highway (IMT), and Asian Highway Network and Asian Highway 1 (AH1). Lengpui Airport near Aizawl (254 km northwest) is the nearest airport in India. Sairang railhead of Bairabi–Sairang line 243 km northwest is the nearest railway station.

See also 

 Borders of India

References

Villages in Khawbung block